Prashant Goswami (born 1959) is an Indian computational geoscientist, climatologist and the director of the National Institute of Science, Technology and Development Studies, New Delhi. He is a former scientist at the Fourth Paradigm Institute (formerly CSIR Centre for Mathematical Modelling and Computer Simulation) and is known for his studies on the tropical atmospheric variability across the time scales. The Council of Scientific and Industrial Research, the apex agency of the Government of India for scientific research, awarded him the Shanti Swarup Bhatnagar Prize for Science and Technology, one of the highest Indian science awards for his contributions to Earth, Atmosphere, Ocean and Planetary Sciences in 2001.

Biography 

Prashant Goswami, born on the New Year's Day of 1959 in the Northeast Indian state of Assam, did his master's degree in physics at Guwahati University and secured a PhD from the Indian Institute of Science in 1982; his doctoral thesis was in mathematical and theoretical physics. After completing his post-doctoral studies at IISc, he joined the Indian Institute of Technology, Kanpur as a visiting professor and in 1993, he moved to the CSIR Centre for Mathematical Modelling and Computer Simulation (C-MMACS) (presently known as Fourth Paradigm Institute) as a scientist where he became the head of the Climate and Environmental Modelling Programme. He served the institute for over 22 years till his move to the National Institute of Science, Technology and Development Studies (NISTADS) as its director in November 2015. In between, he also served as a visiting professor at École Normale Supérieure during 2001–03 and as the dean of the Mathematical and Information Science at the Academy of Scientific and Innovative Research.

Goswami is known to have pioneered long-range, high-resolution dynamical forecasting of monsoon in India for which he developed innovative methodologies, algorithms, models and applications. His team is reported to have studies Cyclone Neelam that affected the southern parts of India in October 2012 which he has detailed in an article published in 2013. His studies have been documented in several peer-reviewed articles; ResearchGate, an online repository of scientific articles, has listed 131 of them. He contributed to the Climate Change 2013: The Physical Science Basis: Working Group I Contribution to the Fifth Assessment Report of the Intergovernmental Panel on Climate Change and was one of the lead authors of the Chapter 14, Climate Phenomena and their Relevance for Future Regional Climate Change. He was a member of the Steering and Program Organizing Committee of the International Conference Energy & Meteorology (ICEM) 2015 and retains his place in the committee for the 2017 conference. The Council of Scientific and Industrial Research awarded him the Shanti Swarup Bhatnagar Prize, one of the highest Indian science awards in 2001.

Selected bibliography

See also 
 Kolluru Sree Krishna

Notes

References

External links 
 
 

Recipients of the Shanti Swarup Bhatnagar Award in Earth, Atmosphere, Ocean & Planetary Sciences
1959 births
Indian scientific authors
Indian geophysicists
Scientists from Assam
Indian Institute of Science alumni
Academic staff of the École Normale Supérieure
Academic staff of IIT Kanpur
Indian climatologists
Living people
20th-century Indian earth scientists